Thozhar Thiyagu (born 30 January 1950), also known as Comrade Thiyagu, is a social activist, politician, writer from Indian state of Tamil Nadu. He is also the General Secretary of Tamil National Liberation Movement and is well known for his proficiency in Marxist ideology.

Early life 
The native of comrade Thiyagu is Nallampur, near Chandrasekarapuram. His father worked as a teacher at Thiruvarur. He was born and brought up in Thiruvarur. He grew up listening to the speeches of Periyar, Annadurai, Jeevanantham and Kamaraj at the general meetings held at Thiruvarur. He had a habit of reading all the DMK, Congress and Tamil National journals.

Introduction to politics 
In 1965 his family moved to Valangaiman. There, Comrade Thiyagu joined a typing school where he met Mr. Ameerjohn, who ran the typing school. Ameerjohn, who was against the caste system not only changed Comrade Thiyagu into an Atheist but also influenced his way of thinking. At that time, leaders like Kuthusi Gurusamy who had split up from Periyar's self-respect movement. When Comrade Thiyagu attended the first convention organised by them with Mr. Ameerjohn, they bought books written by Karl Marx and Lenin. It was at this time when, Comrade Thiyagu was first introduced to Marxism.

Congress experience 
While Comrade Thiyagu was getting impressed by the thoughts of communist books he was reading, he delivered his first speech at the Indian National Congress general meeting in 1965. Since Congress lost the election held in 1967, National Students’ Tamil Development Team was formed under the motivation from Kamaraj. To speak in its general meeting, Comrade Thiyagu went to Madras for the first time. In that meeting, he spoke out his ideas with clarity and without any fear even though Kamaraj, Kannadasan, Jayakandan and other popular people were present on the stage. This incident impressed Kamaraj and he ordered Comrade Thiyagu to deliver introductory speech wherever the convention was held thereafter.

Communist orientation 
Comrade Thiyagu who was completely impressed by communist ideology realized that Congress is a bourgeois party and it would never allow communism or equal rights. In an interview published in Liberation, the leader of Naxalite movement and the General Secretary of Communist Party of India (Marxist–Leninist), Charu Mazumdar had said "Students have to quit studies, renounce family, and move to villages to create an armed revolution. Annihilation is our only slogan". The annihilation policy of the Communist party of India(Marxist–Leninist), which rejected by the Communist Party of India and Communist Party of India (Marxist), impressed Comrade Thiyagu. At that time, the Keezhvenmani massacre also made a big impact on him. In order to destroy the oppressors who were upper caste zamindars, he quit his college and left his home in 1969 to join the Naxalite movement.

Imprisonment 
Comrade Thiyagu was involved in annihilation activities together with the comrades and was imprisoned at the age of 19. In 1971, before the release of a court ruling, he tried to escape the prison with his comrades. Their aim was to send a message to the party that they were not tired even though they were in jail. His death sentence was later reduced to life imprisonment. Even when he was in jail, he joined other comrades and continued to fight for their rights. He continued many activities through "Prisoners Welfare Rights Union" and "Literacy Movement". During his time in prison, Comrade Thiyagu began to read more of Lenin’s writings and started to realize the failure of the impractical annihilation policy of the Communist Party of India(M-L).

Translation of Das Kapital 
Comrade Thiyagu while in jail translated the first part of the book Das Kapital, written by Karl Marx. In accordance with the request of comrade Balasubramaniam, he started translating the remaining two parts of Das Kapital in January, 1980 which he completed in the month of November. The entire translation was published by NCBH and got a good response. In 1983, when the Eelam struggle became stronger, there were major upheavals in jail as well. At that time, Comrade Thiyagu incarcerated at the Trichy jail, held a procession with 1500 prisoners supporting the Eelam combat. Comrade Thiyagu, who joined the Communist Party of India (Marxist) while in prison was released at the end of November 1985.

Political activities 
Comrade Thiyagu courageously pointed out Communist Party of India (Marxist)'s wrong policies related to Eelam. On 15 September 1987, Thileepan began his hunger strike in Eelam. Comrade Thiyagu and some of his friends began "Thileepan Forum" to support him. At the meeting held on that day, Comrade Thiyagu explained about Eelam struggle in detail to the people. He did not hesitate to critique his party’s wrong views about the Eelam struggle. The next day, he was expelled from the Communist Party of India (Marxist). In January 1994, Comrade Thiyagu and Suba. Veerapandian began the "Tamil Tamilar Movement". Later, Tamil National Liberation Movement emerged from it. Four organisations including Tamil Tamilar Movement, and Tamil National Communist Party formed Tamil National Front. This movement had vigorously carried out various protests on Tamil Nadu’s key issues like Cauvery river water dispute issue and Mullai Periyar issue. When Tamil National Liberation movement was formed, "Social justice Tamil Nation" was proposed as the slogan. The aim of the organisation was to carry out Tamil National Politics inclusive social justice.

After genocide 
In 2009, at the end of Eelam war, after Mullivaikal massacre, when most of the movements and parties believed that Prabhakaran would come back and Eelam war would move to the next phase, Comrade Thiyagu was the one who realized and published that the LTTE’s role is over in Eelam war and Eelam struggle had moved to the next phase. At the peak of the Eelam war, Comrade Thiyagu realized that Tamil Nadu was not able to strangle the Indian government to stop the war, due to the lack of a strong Tamil National Movement with a mass following.

Thaai Tamil School 
As an initiative to build Tamil National feeling among people, Comrade Thiyagu started the first Thai Tamil School on 7 June 1993 and such schools are functioning all over Tamil Nadu and have a good reputation among people. The principal political purpose of these schools is to feed in Tamil sentiment among the children, thereby configuring the base for the Tamil National sentiment.

Success or martyrdom 
In the Eelam post-war period, when various political movements are stuck in identity forms of protests, Comrade Thiyagu has begun fast unto death, to bring uprising among Tamils, from 1 October 2013 emphasizing requests that include Sri Lanka should be removed from commonwealth organisation, commonwealth convention should not be held in the soil of genocide; if it happens, India should not be part of that, with the slogan "Success or Martyrdom".

See also 
 Pazha Nedumaran
 Senthamizhan Seeman

References 

1950 births
Living people